The Sabre Wildcat is one of a series of American two-seat ultralight trikes that was designed by Richard Helm and produced by Sabre Aircraft. The aircraft were all supplied complete and ready-to-fly.

Sabre Aircraft ceased operations in 2008.

Design and development
The aircraft features a cable-braced hang glider-style high-wing, weight-shift controls, a two-seats-in-tandem open cockpit, tricycle landing gear and a single engine in pusher configuration. The aircraft is made from tubing, with its double-surface Stream 16 wing covered in Dacron sailcloth. Its  span wing is supported by a single tube-type kingpost and uses an "A" frame control bar.

Like the single-seat Sabre 340 the basic models of the two-seater were intended to be economical to purchase. The Elite model cost US$10,800 in 2000, making it the least expensive complete two-seat aircraft available at the time.

Variants
Trike
Initial version, named just the Sabre Trike. Standard engine was the  Kawasaki 340, with the  Rotax 447 and  Rotax 503 optional. Price US$6,995 in 1998.
Aeros 503
Model offered in 2000, with the Aeros Stranger wing and  Rotax 503 engine. Price US$9,190 in 2000.
Elite
Base model offered circa 2000 with standard  Rotax 447 two-stroke powerplant or optional  Kawasaki 340. Optional cockpit fairing, tundra tires and wheel pants.
Venture
Fully equipped model introduced in 2000 with standard  Rotax 503 two-stroke powerplant and a redesigned titanium carriage frame made in the Ukraine. Optional engines include the  Rotax 582 and the  Kawasaki 340.
Wildcat
Redesigned two-seat model with standard Zanzottera MZ 202  engine, Ivoprop propeller, electric starter and saddle bags. Optional engines include the  Rotax 447,  Rotax 503 and the  Kawasaki 340. The wings available included the Sabre single-surface and Puma double-surface wings. Price US$14,995 in 2005.

Specifications (Wildcat)

References

External links

Archive of Sabre Wildcat official website from March 2008 on Archive.org

1990s United States ultralight aircraft
Single-engined pusher aircraft
Ultralight trikes